Alex Peterson (born 17 October 1994) is an English footballer who plays as a centre forward for non-league side Belper Town.

Club career

Doncaster Rovers
Peterson was with Doncaster Rovers since the age of 11, coming through the club's Centre of Excellence and having made progress throughout the youth ranks, Peterson signed a one-year professional contract with the club on 1 July 2013 Peterson later stated in the club's official interview about being a professional.

Peterson soon made his debut for the first team away at Charlton Athletic on 26 November 2013, replacing midfielder Marc de Val in the 76th minute as Rovers attempted to get something from the game. He first made the starting eleven in the following month in a 0–0 draw at home against Millwall on 29 December 2013. After making his first start, Peterson expressed his satisfaction.

On 18 March 2014, Peterson joined Conference side Barnet on loan for the remainder of the 2013–14 season. He played 90 minutes in a 2–0 loss at Macclesfield Town the same day, but this was the only appearance he made before his loan spell was cut short on 16 April.

Upon returning to Doncaster Rovers, Peterson signed a new 12-month contract with the club. After signing a new contract, Peterson was determined to make a breakthrough in the first team. However, Peterson only made one league appearance against Walsall, coming on as a substitute in the 66th minutes on 27 September 2014.

Peterson joined Scarborough Athletic on loan in November 2014. By some accounts he had a successful spell here, before his loan was cut short and he returned to Doncaster.

At the end of the 2014–15 season, Peterson was released by the club.

Non-league football
After his release by Doncaster Rovers Peterson returned to Scarborough Athletic following his loan spell. He was unveiled by the club following a friendly match against Hull United on 11 July 2015.

References

External links

Alex Peterson career stats at Doncaster Rovers official site

1994 births
Living people
Footballers from Doncaster
English footballers
Association football forwards
Doncaster Rovers F.C. players
Barnet F.C. players
Scarborough Athletic F.C. players
English Football League players
National League (English football) players
Northern Premier League players